Calico Rock–Izard County Airport  is a public use airport located three nautical miles (6 km) northwest of the central business district of Calico Rock, a city in Izard County, Arkansas, United States. The airport is owned by the Arkansas Department of Correction and situated adjacent to its North Central Unit prison.

This airport is included in the National Plan of Integrated Airport Systems for 2011–2015, which categorized it as a general aviation facility.

Facilities and aircraft 
Calico Rock–Izard County Airport covers an area of 60 acres (24 ha) at an elevation of 733 feet (223 m) above mean sea level. It has one runway designated 15/33 with an asphalt surface measuring 3,000 by 60 feet (914 x 18 m).

For the 12-month period ending July 31, 2011, the airport had 2,620 aircraft operations, an average of 218 per month: 99% general aviation and 1% military. At that time there were four single-engine aircraft based at this airport.

References

External links 
 Calico Rock–Izard County (37T) at Arkansas Department of Aeronautics
 Aerial image as of April 2000 from USGS The National Map
 
 

Airports in Arkansas
Transportation in Izard County, Arkansas
Buildings and structures in Izard County, Arkansas